Horton Bay is an unincorporated community and census-designated place (CDP) in Charlevoix County in the U.S. state of Michigan. The population of the CDP was 485 at the 2020 census.  The community is located within Bay Township on northeastern shores of Lake Charlevoix.

History
The area was settled as early as 1876 by pioneer settled Samuel Horton in 1876 as a lumbering community.  Located along Pine Lake (now known as Lake Charlevoix), the community was originally spelled as Horton's Bay when a post office opened on February 27, 1879 with Alonzo Stroud serving as the first postmaster.  The name was shortened to Horton Bay on October 12, 1894.  The post office operated until January 15, 1910.

Ernest Hemingway frequently visited Horton Bay to camp and fish, and the area is the setting for several of his famous The Nick Adams Stories. Hemingway was married here in 1921. 

Horton Bay was designated as a Michigan State Historic Site on November 12, 1975.  The district includes several properties that are also listed on the National Register of Historic Places: Horton Bay General Store, Horton Bay School, and Red Fox Inn (Horton Bay House). 

The community of Horton Bay was listed as a newly-organized census-designated place for the 2010 census, meaning it now has officially defined boundaries and population statistics for the first time.

Geography

Horton Bay is located along the northeastern coastline of Lake Charlevoix.

Major highways
  is a county-designated highway that runs through the community near the shores of Lake Charlevoix.
  is a county-designated highway that runs south into the community and ends at C-56.

Demographics

Education
Horton Bay is served entirely by Boyne City Public Schools to the southeast in Boyne City.

Images

References

Unincorporated communities in Charlevoix County, Michigan
Unincorporated communities in Michigan
Census-designated places in Charlevoix County, Michigan
Census-designated places in Michigan
Populated places established in 1876
1876 establishments in Michigan
Michigan State Historic Sites